Streamline Pictures was an American media company that was best known for its distribution of English-dubbed Japanese animation.

History

Founding 
Founded in Los Angeles, California, in late 1988, Streamline Pictures was one of the first North American companies that was created primarily with the intention of distributing translated anime uncut and faithful to the original content. The founders of Streamline were television writer and producer Carl Macek, who had worked for Harmony Gold USA on the series Robotech, and animation historians Jerry Beck and Fred Patten. At one point or another, Gregory Snegoff, Steve Kramer, Ardwight Chamberlain, Tom Wyner, and Mike Reynolds, all of whom served as series staff writers (and voice actors) on Robotech, worked as independent writers and voice actors for Streamline.

High profile products 
The first high-profile product distributed by Streamline was its December 1989 release of the anime film Akira. The company was also known for its 1989 theatrical distribution of the film Laputa: Castle in the Sky directed by Hayao Miyazaki, and its 1992 video dubbing of The Castle of Cagliostro.  Streamline also dubbed My Neighbor Totoro, and Kiki's Delivery Service, both adapted and directed by Gregory Snegoff, in 1988 for Tokuma Shoten, although these were only used as in-flight films by Japan Airlines at the time. As a fan of Miyazaki's films, Macek did not think Laputa (of which Streamline was the distributor) had received the quality of dubbing that a Miyazaki film deserved. He thought that it could have been done better, so Tokuma Shoten gave him the opportunity to prove his words. For his first project, he asked to dub My Neighbor Totoro, one of his favorite Miyazaki works.  The Streamline dub of My Neighbor Totoro was released theatrically in the U.S. by Troma Films in 1993; but its dub of Kiki's Delivery Service appeared only on the 1990s Japanese laserdisc release of that title.  (Since then, however, all three afore-mentioned films by Miyazaki at Studio Ghibli have been redubbed by Disney.)

Tokuma Shoten was pleased with the quality of the initial work, and it immediately hired Streamline to produce the English language version of Kiki's Delivery Service. Soon after its release, the film was bought by Japan Airlines, who showed it during their flights between Japan and the U.S. Streamline also licensed and dubbed other popular anime series and movies such as Fist of the North Star, Wicked City, Lensman, Vampire Hunter D and The Professional: Golgo 13.

Home video market 
Streamline, in being the first company dedicated to making anime accessible to the English speaking world, was notable for releasing a wide variety of anime that fit in a wide variety of genres, many of which do not fit completely in any genre such as Twilight of the Cockroaches. During the 1990s VHS era, before the common availability of hybrid DVDs, anime distributors released anime via subtitled or dubbed tapes with the subtitled editions being noticeably more expensive than the dubs which were expected to sell better. Streamline is also notable in being the only such company to eschew this practice and release only dubs of its anime. The only exceptions were the later Akira subtitled release and their Robotech Collection, which included episodes of the original Macross, Southern Cross and Mospeada episodes on the same tape along with their Robotech counterparts. (Since then, these three titles were re-released by ADV Films through Harmony Gold.)

Criticism 
Because of Macek's notoriety with a certain branch of fandom, Streamline became one of the early catalysts of the sub vs. dub debate. Macek's philosophy towards anime dubbing, as stated in several interviews, most notably published Protoculture Addicts and Animag, has become largely synonymous with the negative connotation concerning "Americanized dubs".

Later years 
Streamline Pictures stopped producing new anime releases in 1997, but continued to distribute its complete library in North America. In 1996, the company began to release foreign films under its "Independent Filmworks" label until 2000 when the company closed. The company's Modelworks division was sold in 1998 and the "Streamline Pictures Modelworks" division became a separate company operating under the name, "Avatar Creations."

Today, rights to much of the Streamline film and television library (such as Akira and The Castle of Cagliostro) have either reverted to the Japanese rights holder and licensed to other companies; while others have never been re-released due to licensing issues and lack of demand.

List of titles dubbed and/or released

Notes

References 
 Streamline Pictures Review Index and Company Info—Akemi's Anime World

Further reading 
  A series of columns detailing the history of the company by its first employee (not counting the founders).
 
 
  Reviews of Streamline releases (Akira to Crying Freeman).
  Reviews of Streamline releases (Dirty Pair to Fist of the North Star).
  Reviews of Streamline releases (Great Conquest: Romance of the Three Kingdoms to Lapüta: Castle in the Sky).
  Reviews of Streamline releases (Lensman to Lupin III: The Mystery of Mamo).
  Reviews of Streamline releases (Megazone 23, Part 1 to Nadia).
  Reviews of Streamline releases (Neo-Tokyo to Planet Busters).
  Reviews of Streamline releases (The Professional: Golgo 13 to Robot Carnival).
  Reviews of Streamline releases (Robotech to 3×3 Eyes).
  Reviews of Streamline's release of Twilight of the Cockroaches.
  Reviews of Streamline's release of Vampire Hunter D.
  Reviews of Streamline releases (Wicked City).
  Reviews of Streamline releases (Windaria to Zillion: Burning Night, plus the book Tainted Treats).
 
 

1988 establishments in the United States
2002 disestablishments in the United States
Anime companies
Companies established in 1988
Companies disestablished in 2002
Dubbing studios
Home video companies of the United States